Andrey Shturbabin (born 30 May 1972) is a Uzbekistani judoka. He competed at the 1996 Summer Olympics and the 2000 Summer Olympics.

Career
He placed 7th in category -71kg at the 1995 World Championships in Chiba, Japan. He then competed at the 1996 Summer Olympics in Atlanta and lost against bronze medalist Christophe Gagliano in repechage, ending on 7th place. He won silver medal at the 1997 World Military Judo Championship in Dubrovnik, Croatia. He also won bronze medal in -71kg at the 1998 Asian Games in Bangkok, Thailand. He won another bronze medal in -71kg at the 2000 Asian Judo Championships in Osaka, Japan. He competed at the 2000 Summer Olympics in Sydney. In 2001, he placed 5th at World Championships in Munich, which is his best result from this particular competition. 

In 2018, he became a coach of Iran Judo National team. In the end of 2019 he started working with Slovenian judokas in Judo Club Bežigrad.

References

1972 births
Living people
Uzbekistani male judoka
Olympic judoka of Uzbekistan
Judoka at the 1996 Summer Olympics
Judoka at the 2000 Summer Olympics
Place of birth missing (living people)
Judoka at the 1998 Asian Games
Asian Games medalists in judo
Asian Games bronze medalists for Uzbekistan
Medalists at the 1998 Asian Games
20th-century Uzbekistani people
21st-century Uzbekistani people